Adelheid is the modern Dutch and German form of the Old High German female given name Adalheidis, meaning "nobility" or "noble-ness". It may refer to the following people:

 Saint Adelheid or Adelaide of Italy, (931–999), Holy Roman Empress and second wife of Holy Roman Emperor Otto the Great
 Eupraxia of Kiev (1071–1109), regnal name Adelheid
 Adelheid of Vohburg (1122–1190), first Queen consort of Frederick I, Holy Roman Emperor
 Adelheid of Wolfratshausen (died 1126), second wife of Berengar II, Count of Sulzbach
 Adelheid (abbess of Müstair) (fl. 1211–1233), Swiss Benedictine abbess
 Princess Adelheid of Hohenlohe-Langenburg (1835–1900), niece of Queen Victoria of the United Kingdom
 Adelheid Maria Eichner (1762–1787), German composer
 Adelheid von Gallitzin (1748–1806), Russian princess from Prussia
 Adelheid von Sachsen-Meiningen (1792-1849), Queen consort of the United Kingdom (Queen Adelaide)
 Adelheid Popp (1869–1939), Austrian journalist and politician
 Archduchess Adelheid of Austria (1914–1971), member of the Austrian Imperial Family
 Adelheid Seeck (1912–1973), German film actress
 Adelheid Arndt (born 1952), German actress
 Adelheid Schulz (born 1955), German terrorist
 Adelheid Morath (born 1984), German cross-country mountain biker

See also 
 Adelaide (given name), the English form of the name
 Heidi (given name), a nickname for Adelheid
 Adele (given name), a short form of Adelheid

References 

German feminine given names
Swiss feminine given names